The Ninety East Ridge (also rendered as Ninetyeast Ridge, 90E Ridge or 90°E Ridge) is a mid-ocean ridge on the Indian Ocean floor named for its near-parallel strike along the 90th meridian at the center of the Eastern Hemisphere. The ridge extends between latitudes 33°S and 17°N and has an average width of 200 km.

Description
The ridge divides the Indian Ocean into the West and East Indian Ocean. The northeastern side is named the Wharton Basin and ceases at the western end of the Diamantina Fracture Zone which passes to the east and almost to the Australian continent.

The ridge is primarily composed of Ocean Island Tholeiites (OIT), a subset of basalt which increase in age from approximately 43.2 ± 0.5 Ma in the south to 81.8 ± 2.6 Ma in the north. A more recent analysis using modern Ar–Ar techniques gives an age progression from 77 Ma at 5°N to 43 Ma at 31°S. This age progression has led geologists to theorize that a hotspot in the mantle beneath the Indo-Australian Plate created the ridge as the plate has moved northward in the late Mesozoic and Cenozoic.  This theory is supported by a detailed analysis of the chemistry of the Kerguelen Plateau and Rajmahal Traps, which together, geologists believe, represent the flood basalts erupted at the initiation of volcanism at the Kerguelen hotspot which was then sheared in two as the Indian subcontinent moved northward.

Surveying
The ridge has been surveyed several times in the past, including several times by the Deep Sea Drilling Program (DSDP). In 2007, the RV Roger Revelle collected bathymetric, magnetic and seismic data together with dredge samples from nine sites along the ridge as part of an Integrated Ocean Drilling Program (IODP) site survey intended to examine the hotspot hypothesis for the ridge.

Origins
It had been assumed that India and Australia were on a single tectonic plate for at least the last 32 million years. However, considering the high level of large earthquakes in the Ninety East Ridge area and the evidence of deformation in the central Indian Ocean, it is more appropriate to consider the deformed region in the central Indian Ocean as a broad plate boundary zone separating the Indian Plate and the Australian Plate.

Paleontology 
During the late Paleocene around 60 million years ago, parts of the Ninety East Ridge were temporarily exposed for 2-3 million years as volcanic islands probably 1,000 km from the nearest land. Preserved pollen and plant cuticle fragments have been found in boreholes drilled on the ridge. The flora has been noted to be most similar to Australian and Antarctic floras, rather than to Indian floras, including Podocarpaceae conifers, as well as 15 species of angiosperms, including members of Arecaceae, Chloranthaceae sensu lato, Lauraceae, Gunnera, Gillbeea, and possibly Callitrichaceae.

See also 
 Eighty Five East Ridge

References

Further reading

External links

90 East Ridge Formation (94 Ma - present)
 Video including 90 East Ridge Formation (94 Ma (million years ago) - present). YouTube. Plate tectonics, Paleogeography, & Ice Ages (dual hemispheres) by Christopher Scotese, 2019. (Field Museum of Natural History & Northwestern University).
 Video including 90 East Ridge Formation (94 Ma (million years ago) - present). YouTube. Plate Tectonics, 540Ma - Modern World by Christopher Scotese, 2016. (Field Museum of Natural History & Northwestern University).

Plate tectonics
Underwater ridges of the Indian Ocean
Seamount chains